McTyer may refer to:

 Tim McTyer (born 1975), American football player and coach
 Torry McTyer (born 1995), American football player

See also
 McTyeire (disambiguation)